Ivan Andreyevich Urgant (born 16 April 1978) is a Russian television host, presenter, actor, musician and producer. His best known roles in film are Boris in the Yolki series and as Danila in Lucky Trouble. Between 2012 and 2022 he has hosted Evening Urgant, a late-night talk show, which was suspended in February 2022 after Urgant expressed his opposition to the 2022 Russian invasion of Ukraine. According to the 2008 and 2011 surveys, Urgant is Russia's most popular TV presenter. He is the chairman of the board of trustees of the Friends Charitable Foundation.

Biography

Early life
Ivan Urgant was born in Leningrad, Russian SFSR, USSR into a family of actors, the son of Andrei Urgant and Valeriya Kiseleva. His paternal grandparents were actors Nina Urgant and Lev Milinder. His Estonian surname Urgant comes from Nina's father, Nikolai Andreyevich Urgant, a NKVD Major from Luga and a son of Räpina-born Hindrik Urgand. He is of mixed Russian, Estonian, and Jewish heritage. About a year after Ivan's birth the family separated. After his parents broke up, he lived with his mother and stepfather - Leningrad actor Dmitri Ladygin.

Ivan studied at the Leningrad Children's Music School No. 18, at the Gymnasium at the State Russian Museum. He graduated from Saint Petersburg State Theatre Arts Academy. After receiving his acting education, Ivan did not engage in theater as the main profession. He worked as a waiter, bartender, and then as a host in nightly shows in clubs. In 2018, it was reported he had taken Israeli citizenship.

Career
In 1999, Urgant managed to get a job at the St. Petersburg radio stations. In addition, he appeared on television, was the host of the program Petersburg Courier on 5TV. Later, he was moved to Moscow and continued his career on the radio - first on Russian Radio, and then on "Hit-FM."

In May 2001, Ivan first appeared on Moscow television, on the television channel MTV Russia. He received an invitation to a casting at a time when Olga Shelest and Anton Komolov were looking for a couple of hosts to team up with on the show Cheerful Morning. Since 2002, after the departure of the original team of VJs of "MTV Russia", he began to host the programs Total Show and Expresso.

From 2003 to 2005 he was involved in a number of TV projects on the Russia-1: he was the host of TV show People's Artist and Pyramid. He has been working on Channel One since 2005. At the moment, Ivan is a TV presenter in the programs Smak, Evening Urgant and Prozhektorperiskhilton. Also he often conducts award ceremonies.

Starting from 2006, Urgant has appeared with Vladimir Pozner in the travel documentary series titled Travels of Pozner and Urgant.

In 2007, 2009, 2010 (2), 2011, 2014, 2015 and 2016, Urgant was awarded TEFI.

On 16 May 2009, he presented the finale of the 2009 Eurovision Song Contest with former Russian Eurovision participant Alsou. In December 2017, Urgant was one of the hosts of the 2018 FIFA World Cup Team Draw Show, with Gary Lineker and Maria Komandnaya.

On 24 February 2022, he posted "No to War" on his Instagram account following the invasion of Ukraine by Russia after which his late-night programme was taken off-air. It was reported that he left Russia for Israel with his wife on the 11 March.

Other ventures
From 2011, Urgant owns a restaurant The Sad ("Garden") together with Aleksandr Tsekalo in Moscow. He has been a board member and co-owner of the elite real estate agency "W1Evans" since 2016.

Filmography

Films

Yolki, 2010
Lucky Trouble, 2011
Vysotsky. Thank You For Being Alive, 2011
Yolki 2, 2011
Yolki 3, 2013
Yolki 1914, 2014
Yolki 5, 2016
Yolki 6, 2017

Television
Urgant has hosted various TV shows, including:
 Petersburg Courier (5TV, 1999)
 Big Movie (MTV Russia, 2001)
 Cheerful Morning (MTV Russia, 2001–2002)
 Total Show (MTV Russia, 2002)
 Expresso (MTV Russia, 2002–2004)
 People's Artist (Russia-1, 2003–2004)
 Pyramid (Russia-1, 2004)
 Great Premiere (Channel One, 2005)
 Spring with Ivan Urgant (Channel One, 2006)
 Gusto (Channel One; 2006–2018)
 Circus With Stars (Channel One, 2007–2008)
 Stenka na stenku (Showdown) (Channel One, 2007–2008)
 The Magic World of Walt Disney (Channel One, 2007–2011)
 Big Difference (Channel One, 2008–2012)
 One-Storied America (Channel One, 2008)
 Prozhektorperiskhilton (Channel One, 2008–2012, 2017–present)
 Tour de France (Channel One, 2011)
 Evening Urgant (Channel One; 2012–present)
 Their Italia (Channel One; 2012)
 The German Puzzle (Channel One; 2013)
 England in general and particular (Channel One; 2014)
 Jewish Happiness (Channel One; 2016)
 Podmoskovnie vechera (Channel One; 2016–present). Producer.
 In search of Don Quixote (Channel One; 2017)

Music
Ivan Urgant plays guitar, piano and drums. In the late 1990s he acted under the pseudonym Vnuk ( - Grandson). In 2011 Ivan renewed his own singing career and now is acting under the pseudonym Grisha Urgant.

Discography
 1999 — "Star" 
 2012 — "Estrada"

Theatrical experience
Savva Vasilkov in the play of the Moscow Pushkin Drama Theatre "Mad Money".

References

External links

1978 births
Living people
Russian television presenters
Mass media people from Saint Petersburg
Late night television talk show hosts
Russian television talk show hosts
Russian activists against the 2022 Russian invasion of Ukraine
Russian male film actors
Russian male comedians
Russian State Institute of Performing Arts alumni
Russian people of Estonian descent
Russian people of Jewish descent
Israeli people of Estonian descent
Israeli people of Russian descent
Israeli people of Russian-Jewish descent